J. Steven Rhodes (born September 29, 1951, New Orleans, Louisiana) was Ronald Reagan's special assistant for intergovernmental affairs, Vice President George H. W. Bush's chief domestic affairs adviser and ambassador to the Republic of Zimbabwe when Bush became president (Appointed: March 8, 1990*; Presentation of Credentials: April 5, 1990; Termination of Mission: Left post on August 6, 1990).  Rhodes is an Adjunct Professor in the Negotiation, Conflict Resolution and Peace Building Department at California State University, Dominguez Hills.

Career

He worked at Dart Industries from 1973, rising to become Director of Government Affairs.

Rhodes was Managing Partner of Claiborne-Rhodes International, LLC (in 2015, he was Chairman and CEO)  and a member of the Board of  Governors for the California Community Colleges System (appointed in 2004 by Governor Arnold Schwarzenegger).

Rhodes received a Masters of Business Administration, Marketing emphasis from Pepperdine University and a Bachelors of Business Administration, Industrial Relations concentration from Loyola Marymount University in Los Angeles.

BlackPast indicates he was nominated for Ambassador in 1989, confirmed soon after, and served 16 months as ambassador, resigning for personal and health reasons. They stated “Published newspaper reports however indicated that he was the target of an illegal drugs investigation.”  An October 17, 1990 Washington Post news article cites that October 4 as the date of Ambassador Rhodes' letter of resignation. Thus, his term in office was from April 5 to October 4, 1990—just under six months, not 16, as BlackPast erroneously indicated.

References

Ambassadors of the United States to Zimbabwe
Reagan administration personnel
George H. W. Bush administration personnel
California State University, Dominguez Hills faculty
Loyola Marymount University alumni
Pepperdine University alumni
Living people
1951 births
20th-century American diplomats